Draughts is a board game café business based in London, and the first board game café in the city. As of October 2022, the business owns two cafés, one in Hackney and one in Waterloo. The establishment serves craft beers as well as coffee and snacks. A library of board games are available at both venues, and customers may also buy games from the café.

Its clientele includes board game hobbyists as well as families, young professionals, and couples. Draughts hires staff with hospitality experience to serve drinks and teach customers how to play the games.

History 
The business was first founded under a railway arch in Haggerston, Hackney by Nick Curci and Toby Hamand in 2014, aiming to stock 500 board games on its premises. The creation of the cafe was funded by bank and government loans, as well as a Kickstarter campaign. It initially charged a flat rate of £5 for a full day, with a reduced fee of £3.50 for members. It followed Thirsty Meeples, the first board game café to open in the UK, and was inspired by the Canadian board game café Snakes and Lattes.

The Waterloo café opened in 2018, located underneath another railway arch on Leake Street. At this time, the Hackney location was host to over 800 board games.

In October 2019, the Hackney café moved from under a railway arch in Haggerston to a building on Kingsland Road in Dalston, a venue that was twice the size of the previous establishment, able to house 180 guests and over 1000 games. The entry fee for non-members had been changed to allow four hours of gaming, instead of a full day.

References

External links 
 Official website

Board game cafés
Organisations based in the London Borough of Hackney
Coffeehouses and cafés in the United Kingdom
2014 establishments in the United Kingdom
British companies established in 2014